Yazoo Brewing Company is a regional brewery in Nashville, Tennessee, United States. It was founded in 2003 by brewmaster Linus Hall, and has since expanded operations and won several awards.

History
The brewery was located in what was once the Marathon Motor Works factory building in downtown Nashville, but moved to The Gulch in March, 2010. The new brewery featured an expanded taproom with 18 taps and a patio for outdoor seating with a forty barrel brewing system.

Linus Hall and his wife Lila are both from Mississippi, and moved to Nashville in 1996. Linus Hall built the brewery.

Awards
 Embrace The Funk Cherry Deux Rouges won Bronze in the "Wood- and Barrel-Aged Sour Beer" category at the 2014 Great American Beer Festival.
 The Yazoo Hefeweizen won the gold medal in the "South German-Style Hefeweizen/Hefeweissbier" category at the 2004 Great American Beer Festival.
 Best Microbrewery, 2005 Best of Nashville, Nashville Scene.
 Best Local Beer, Yazoo Pale Ale, 2006 Best of Nashville, Nashville Scene.
 Best Underground Happy Hour, Yazoo Tap Room, 2007 Best of Nashville Nashville Scene.

Etymology
The name Yazoo is taken from the Yazoo River, which meets the Mississippi River in Hall’s hometown, Vicksburg, Mississippi.

Beers

Pale Ale
Dos Perros
Hefeweizen
Hop Perfect 
Sue
Sly Rye Porter
Onward Stout
Various seasonal beers
Embrace The Funk (Series of Sour and Wild beers)

See also
 Barrel-aged beer

References

External links

Beer brewing companies based in Tennessee
Manufacturing companies based in Nashville, Tennessee
Food and drink companies established in 2003
2003 establishments in Tennessee
American companies established in 2003